Cottler is a surname. Notable people with the surname include:

 Irving Cottler (1918–1989), an American drummer
 Elaine Showalter (born Elaine Cottler in 1941), American literary critic, feminist, and writer

See also
 Kottler (disambiguation)
 Cotler
 Cotter (disambiguation)